The Public Opinion Afro Orchestra is a Melbourne-based band which performs Nigerian funk in the vein of Fela Kuti. The band was founded by  DJ Manchild, Zvi Belling and Tristan Ludowyk. The band has varying membership that can be up to 19 members. Their album Do Anything Go Anywhere was nominated for 2010 ARIA Award for Best World Music Album.

Discography

Albums

Extended plays

Awards and nominations

ARIA Music Awards
The ARIA Music Awards is an annual awards ceremony that recognises excellence, innovation, and achievement across all genres of Australian music. They commenced in 1987.

! 
|-
| 2010
| Do Anything Go Anywhere
| ARIA Award for Best World Music Album
| 
| 
|-

Music Victoria Awards
The Music Victoria Awards are an annual awards night celebrating Victorian music. They commenced in 2006.

! 
|-
| 2013
| The Public Opinion Afro Orchestra
| Best Global or Reggae Act
| 
|rowspan="2"| 
|-
| 2019
| The Public Opinion Afro Orchestra
| Best Intercultural Act
| 
|-

References

Australian world music groups